Tom Hiddleston is an English actor who has appeared in film, television series and on stage. Hiddleston made his film debut in the 2007 drama Unrelated which was directed by Joanna Hogg. He worked with Hogg again in the 2010 film Archipelago. In 2008, he appeared on stage alongside Kenneth Branagh in the play Ivanov. It was Branagh who encouraged him to audition for the role of Thor in the 2011 Marvel Studios film of the same name that Branagh was directing. After auditioning for Thor, Branagh thought he would be better suited for the role of Loki which then earned Hiddleston international recognition and the Empire Award for Best Male Newcomer. He then reprised the role in The Avengers (2012), Thor: The Dark World (2013), Thor: Ragnarok (2017), Avengers: Infinity War (2018), Avengers: Endgame (2019) and in the spin-off television series Loki (2021).

He has appeared in films such as Steven Spielberg's war film War Horse (2011), The Deep Blue Sea with Rachel Weisz (2011), Woody Allen's romantic comedy Midnight in Paris (2011), Jim Jarmusch's fantasy comedy-drama Only Lovers Left Alive (2013) and Guillermo del Toro's gothic romance film Crimson Peak (2015). Also in 2015, he starred in the  biographical drama I Saw the Light as country music singer Hank Williams. In 2017, he starred alongside Brie Larson and Samuel L. Jackson in the monster movie Kong: Skull Island.

His television credits include being a series regular on the 2006 British satirical black comedy television series Suburban Shootout with Ruth Wilson, on the crime drama series Wallander with Branagh from 2008–2010, the BBC series Henry IV, Part I and Part II (2012) with Jeremy Irons and as the title character in Henry V (2012). In 2016, he starred as Jonathan Pine in the British spy serial The Night Manager with Elizabeth Debicki and Hugh Laurie. That role earned him a Golden Globe Award for Best Actor in a Miniseries or Television Film.

Hiddleston starred as the title character in a production of Coriolanus (2013–14) and again as the title character in a limited run of William Shakespeare's Hamlet directed by Kenneth Branagh (2017). He made his Broadway debut in a 2019 revival of Betrayal with Zawe Ashton and Charlie Cox.

Film

Television

Stage

Radio

Video games

See also 
 List of awards and nominations received by Tom Hiddleston

References

External links 
 

Hiddleston, Tom
British filmographies